Usoke is a village in the Urambo District, of Tanzania's Tabora Region.

See also 

 Railway stations in Tanzania
 Transport in Tanzania

References

Further reading 

 Columbia Encyclopedia, Sixth Edition (at encyclopedia.com)
 Tabora Region Socio-Economic Profile, joint publication by The Planning Commission Dar es Salaam and Regional Commissioner's Office Tabora, 1998

Populated places in Tabora Region
1850s establishments in Africa